Outeniqua may refer to:

 Outeniqua Mountains, a mountain range that runs a parallel to the southern coast of South Africa
 SAS Outeniqua, a sealift and replenishment ship operated by the South African Navy
 1396 Outeniqua, an asteroid of the Main Belt